Orange County Choppers is an American reality television series, an American Chopper spin-off, and produced by Pilgrim Studios. The program chronicles Paul Teutul Sr. ("Senior") and his Orange County Choppers (OCC) team as they design and fabricate some of the most complicated builds of their careers. Evan Favaro is hired as Creative Director and proves his leadership and bike-building skills.

The one-season, eight-episode Orange County Choppers series originally aired on CMT between August 18, 2013 and January 11, 2014 as the successor to the American Chopper: Senior vs. Junior series (2010-2012). On August 18, 2013, a two-hour "special" titled "Orange County Choppers: Sneak Peak" appeared on CMT as an introduction to the series. The first episode, "The Goody's Popcorn Bike", was shown three months later on November 16, 2013. The spin-off's one and only season concluded with "Bikes for Everyone" on January 11, 2014.

Crew members 
 Paul Teutul Sr. – Owner
 Steve Moreau – Executive Vice President & Chief Operating Officer
 Ron Salsbury – Operations Manager
 Jason Pohl – Lead Industrial Designer & Artist
 Jim Quinn – Lead Engineer & Machinist
 Evan Favaro – Creative Director & Fabricator
 Christian Welter – Mechanic/Fabricator
 Rick Petko – Mechanic/Fabricator
 Nicholas Hansford – Mechanic/Fabricator

Episodes

Season 1 (2013-2014)

Specials

See also 
 Orange County Choppers bikes

References

External links 
 
 

2010s American reality television series

American Chopper
English-language television shows
Motorcycle television series
Television shows set in New York (state)